Ryan Christie (born 22 February 1995) is a Scottish professional footballer who plays as a midfielder for Premier League club AFC Bournemouth and the Scotland national team. He began his career with Inverness Caledonian Thistle before joining Celtic in 2015, and had two spells on loan at Aberdeen. He has also represented the Scotland under-21 and full national teams.

Club career

Inverness Caledonian Thistle
Christie was born in Inverness in 1995; he is the son of footballer Charlie Christie, who was playing for Caledonian Thistle at the time and who had previously been a reserve player with Celtic.

Christie joined the Inverness Caledonian Thistle youth system aged 10, before eventually signing his first professional contract in 2011. He signed a new deal with the club under Terry Butcher, and was among several youngsters to be promoted to the club's first team.

Christie made his debut in the Scottish Premiership against Celtic on 29 December 2013. He came on as a substitute in the 100th minute in the Scottish League Cup Final against Aberdeen, a game that Inverness lost on penalties. Despite this, Christie helped the club finish in the top-six of the Scottish Premiership. His first goal for Inverness came in a 2–1 loss against Motherwell on 1 April 2014. Christie added two more goals later in the season against Dundee United and St Johnstone. After impressive displays for Inverness, Christie signed a new contract with the club at the end of the 2013–14 season.

Christie scored his first goal of the 2014–15 season in a 2–0 win over Hamilton Academical. Christie's performances against Dundee, Motherwell, Celtic, Kilmarnock and Partick Thistle saw him win the SPFL Young Player of the Month for August. During a match against St Mirren in October 2014, he was sent-off for the first time in his career – being dismissed by referee Willie Collum for two-bookable offences. Christie added to his earlier success by winning the SPFL Young Player of the Month award for February 2015, and his eye-catching form over the whole season subsequently saw him shortlisted for the Young Player of the Year award. Although he didn't win that accolade, he was later honoured with the SFWA Young Player of the Year award. Christie started the 2015 Scottish Cup Final and was later substituted for James Vincent, who scored the winning goal in a 2–1 victory over Falkirk. After the match, Christie described winning the Scottish Cup as "unbelievable, hard to put into words".

Celtic

2015–16
On 1 September 2015, Christie joined Celtic on a four-year deal. After signing for the Scottish champions, Christie was immediately sent back to Inverness on a season-long loan deal. He sustained a knee injury against Motherwell in November, and was recalled by Celtic so he could work with their medical staff at their Lennoxtown training complex. In December 2015, Celtic announced they would be recalling Christie from his loan spell at Inverness.

Christie made his debut for Celtic on 23 January 2016 in their 3–1 win over St Johnstone, coming on as an 88th-minute substitute for Stuart Armstrong.

Aberdeen loans
On 24 January 2017, Christie joined Aberdeen on loan until the end of the 2016–17 season. He scored his first goal for Aberdeen on 4 February 2017, in a 2–0 win against Partick Thistle. He helped Aberdeen finish second in the 2016–17 Scottish Premiership and progress to the 2017 Scottish Cup Final, but was unable to take part in the cup final because it was against his parent club Celtic.

Christie returned to Aberdeen on loan for most of the 2017–18 season, moving in June 2017 as part of a deal for Jonny Hayes.

2018–19
Christie returned to Celtic for the 2018–19 season. Neil Lennon, who returned to Celtic as manager later in the season, said in July 2019 that he had wanted to sign Christie for Hibernian during the summer of 2018 as part of a proposed deal for John McGinn. In the 2018–19 League Cup semi-final against Hearts at Murrayfield, Christie won a penalty, caused a goalkeeping error and hit a "wonderful left-foot shot" leading to each goal in the eventual 3–0 victory. Christie signed a new contract with Celtic in November 2018. On 2 December, he scored the only goal of the 2018 Scottish League Cup Final at Hampden against former club Aberdeen. His season ended abruptly on 14 April 2019 in the Scottish Cup semi-final, again at Hampden against Aberdeen, when he suffered facial fractures in an aerial collision with opponent Dominic Ball, who was sent off for the reckless nature of the challenge.

2019–20
Christie scored a hat-trick in a 7–0 win against St Johnstone in the first game of the 2019–20 Scottish Premiership season. In October 2020, he scored the opening goal of the 2019–20 Scottish Cup semi-final against Aberdeen (delayed from its usual April scheduling due the COVID-19 pandemic in Scotland, which also led to Celtic being awarded the Premiership title after the season was curtailed) with a curling left-footed shot from outside the penalty area – Celtic won 2–0. In the final against Hearts he scored a very similar goal, again the first of the match and with almost the same amount of time elapsed, but then missed his penalty in the subsequent shootout following a 3–3 draw after extra time; he was the only Celtic player to fail with his attempt as they won the trophy.

AFC Bournemouth 
On 31 August 2021, Christie moved to England, joining Championship club AFC Bournemouth on a three-year contract, for a reported transfer fee of around £1.5 million. On 11 September 2021, Christie came off the bench to make his Bournemouth debut in the side's 3–0 win over Barnsley.

International career
On 25 August 2014, Christie was called up by Scotland U21. After being left on the bench against Slovakia U21, Christie finally made his Scotland U21 debut against Luxembourg U21 on 9 September 2014, coming on as a substitute for Lewis Macleod in the second half, which Scotland U21 won 3–0.

Christie received his first call-up to the senior Scotland squad for a friendly against the Netherlands in November 2017, and played the full 90 minutes of the 1–0 defeat. He scored his first international goal on 16 November 2019, opening the scoring with a curling shot from outside the penalty area in a 2–1 away win over Cyprus in  UEFA Euro 2020 qualification. In September 2020, he scored penalties in successive matches as Scotland drew with Israel and defeated the Czech Republic in the 2020–21 UEFA Nations League.

In October 2020, Christie was required to pull out of the Scotland squad for a Euro 2020 play-off semi-final against Israel after being in close contact with Stuart Armstrong, who had tested positive for COVID-19. A month later, Christie returned to the team and scored Scotland's only goal in the Euro 2020 play-off final against Serbia; they won the tie after a penalty shootout after a 1–1 draw, qualifying for a major tournament for the first time in 22 years.

Career statistics

Club

International

Scores and results list Scotland's goal tally first, score column indicates score after each Christie goal.

Honours
Inverness Caledonian Thistle
Scottish Cup: 2014–15

Celtic
Scottish Premiership: 2018–19, 2019–20
Scottish Cup: 2018–19, 2019–20
Scottish League Cup: 2018–19, 2019–20

AFC Bournemouth
Championship runner-up: 2021–22

Individual
SPFL Young Player of the Month: August 2014, February 2015
SFWA Young Player of the Year: 2014–15

References

External links
Profile at the AFC Bournemouth website

Profile and stats at AFC Heritage Trust

1995 births
Living people
People educated at Millburn Academy
Footballers from Inverness
Scottish footballers
Association football midfielders
Scotland international footballers
Scotland under-21 international footballers
UEFA Euro 2020 players
Scottish Professional Football League players
Inverness Caledonian Thistle F.C. players
Celtic F.C. players
Aberdeen F.C. players
English Football League players
Premier League players
AFC Bournemouth players